Saint-Guen is a former commune in the Côtes-d'Armor department of Brittany in northwestern France. On 1 January 2017, it was merged into the new commune Guerlédan.

Population
Inhabitants of Saint-Guen are called saint-guennois in French.

See also
Communes of the Côtes-d'Armor department

References

External links

Former communes of Côtes-d'Armor